Gerardo Iván Contreras Gámez (born January 29, 1974 in Tampico) is a former Mexican professional volleyball player. His position on the field is outside hitter. Contreras has been voted player of the year in 2005, 2007 and 2008 in Belgium. Contreras is also captain of Knack Roeselare.

Contreras attended Penn State University where he won an NCAA National Championship as a freshman and was named the AVCA National Player of the Year in 1997.

Among Contreras' former teams are Osnabrück in Germany, MTV Näfels in Switzerland, Knack Roeselare in Belgium and Ziraat Bankası Ankara in Turkey.

In 2004, he won the MVP award from the Liga de Voleibol Superior Masculino, playing with Gigantes de Adjuntas. He played for this team from 2002 to 2006.

Before playing volleyball, Contreras was practicing athletics, especially hurdling, high jump and long jump. Contreras had  also tried karate and tennis, but he was tired of individual sports and started to play volleyball, which he preferred over basketball.

On May 27, 2008, Contreras revealed that he will sign a lucrative one-year deal with Ziraat Bankası Ankara. He returned to Roeselare after one season.

In recognition of his performance during the 2009, he won the "Luchador Olmeca" award in January, 2010.

Clubs
 Penn State Nittany Lions men's volleyball
 MTV Näfels (1997–2000)
 Gigantes de Adjuntas (2000)
 Knack Roeselare (2000–2008)
 Gigantes de Adjuntas (2002–2006)
 Ziraat Bankası Ankara (2008–2009)
 Knack Roeselare (2009–2011)
 Leones de Ponce (2011)

Individual awards
 1994 "NCAA AVCA Second Team All American"
 1995 "NCAA AVCA First Team All American"
 1996 "NCAA AVCA First Team All American"
 1997 "NCAA AVCA First Team All American and Player of the Year"
 1998 "Voted Runner up Player of the Year in Switzerland"
 1999 "Player of the Year in Switzerland"
 2000 "Player of the Year in Switzerland"
 2001 "Top Teams Cup Champion"
 2004 Liga de Voleibol Superior Masculino "MVP"
 2004–2005 "European Champions League Best Scorer"
 2004–2005 "Player of the Year in Belgium"
 2006–2007 "Player of the Year in Belgium"
 2007–2008 "European Champions League Best Scorer and Best Attacker"
 2007–2008 "Player of the Year in Belgium"
 2008 "Best Scorer Olympic Qualifier, Caguas P.R."
 2009 "MVP in World Championships Qualifier, Guadalajara Mexico"
 2010 Luchador Olmeca
 2011 "Best Scorer Panamerican Games, Guadalajara, Mexico"
18

References

External links
 Ivan's website
 FIVB Profile
Iván Contreras profile at knackrandstad.be 

1974 births
Living people
Sportspeople from Tampico, Tamaulipas
Volleyball players at the 2007 Pan American Games
Volleyball players at the 2011 Pan American Games
Penn State Nittany Lions men's volleyball players
Ziraat Bankası volleyball players
Mexican men's volleyball players
Mexican expatriate sportspeople in the United States
Mexican expatriate sportspeople in Switzerland
Mexican expatriate sportspeople in Puerto Rico
Mexican expatriate sportspeople in Belgium
Mexican expatriate sportspeople in Turkey
Pan American Games competitors for Mexico